Ball Park Franks is an American brand of hot dogs made by Tyson Foods and popularized in 1958 by the Detroit Tigers of Major League Baseball. Ball Park Frank is the most consumed hot dog in America with 94.9 million consumers in 2017. In 2022, Ball Park Franks were the leading selling refrigerated frankfurter with 160.7 million dollars in sales, second behind was Oscar Mayer with 98.4 million in sales.

History
The history of Ball Park Franks began in 1958 when the Detroit Tigers became dissatisfied with the hot dogs being sold in their park. In 1959, a meat-packing company from Livonia, Michigan, called Hygrade Food Products owned and run by the Slotkin family, won a competition to be the exclusive supplier of hot dogs to the Tigers and Tiger Stadium. Hygrade employee Gus Hauff invented the recipe for the Ball Park Frank in 1958, which to this day remains a secret. Meanwhile, Hygrade launched a contest for its employees in order to come up with the best brand name for their stadium hot dogs, which was won by saleswoman Mary Ann Kurk, with the name "Ball Park Franks".

After becoming the official hot dog of the Detroit Tigers, and the official Briggs Stadium hot dog, Ball Park Franks went on sale commercially. 

In 1985, Cincinnati schoolteacher Bob Wood visited every major league park, rating each on its hot dogs. In his book, Dodger Dogs to Fenway Franks: and All the Wieners in Between, Wood ranked the Ball Park Frank at #1, citing that “A ballpark frank with a little mustard on the stick is a dream fulfilled. And proof that worthy experiences never die in the tradition of a fine baseball park.”

In 2008 Ball Park added numerous varieties to their hot dog lineup, perhaps in response to the healthier eating trend sweeping through the United States throughout the early 2000s.

Sara Lee acquired Hygrade from Hanson Industries in 1989. In 2014, Tyson Foods acquired Hillshire Brands, the corporation formerly known as the Sara Lee Corporation, and with it, the Ball Park Franks brand.

Varieties 

Ball Park franks currently come in the following varieties:

 Prime Beef Franks
 Angus Beef Franks
 Beef Franks
 Classic Franks
 Turkey Franks

References

External links
Official website

Sara Lee Corporation brands
Brand name hot dogs
Baseball culture
Tyson Foods